is a Japanese footballer currently playing as a midfielder for Giravanz Kitakyushu.

Career statistics

Club

Notes

References

External links

1999 births
Living people
Japanese footballers
Japan youth international footballers
Association football midfielders
J1 League players
J2 League players
J3 League players
Urawa Red Diamonds players
Tokushima Vortis players
Kagoshima United FC players
Giravanz Kitakyushu players